Stephanie Ingram is a Canadian make-up artist. She won an Academy Award in the category Best Makeup and Hairstyling for the film The Eyes of Tammy Faye.

Selected filmography 
 The Eyes of Tammy Faye (2021; co-won with Linda Dowds and Justin Raleigh)

References

External links 
 

Living people
Year of birth missing (living people)
Place of birth missing (living people)
Canadian make-up artists
Best Makeup Academy Award winners
Best Makeup BAFTA Award winners